Kazuyo (written: ,  or ) is a feminine Japanese given name. Notable people with the name include:

, Japanese voice actress
, Japanese women's basketball player
, Japanese swimmer
, Japanese businesswoman
, Japanese actress
, Japanese architect

Japanese feminine given names